Sérgio Domingos Reis Silva (born 26 February 1994) is a Portuguese professional footballer who plays as a defender for Liga 1 club Arema.

Club career

Portugal
On 27 July 2013, Silva made his professional debut with Oliveirense in a 2013–14 Taça da Liga match against Moreirense, when he started and played the full game. In the first match of the  2013–14 Segunda Liga season against Penafiel on the 11 August, he made his league debut.

Indonesia
On 22 August 2021, Silva signed a one-year contract with Indonesian Liga 1 club Arema on a free transfer. Sérgio made his league debut in a 1–1 draw against PSM Makassar on 5 September 2021 as a substitute for Dedik Setiawan in the 46th minute. He scored his first goal on 30 July 2022, which lead to the 2–1 victory against PSIS at Kanjuruhan Stadium.

Honours

Club
Arema
Indonesia President's Cup: 2022

Individual
Liga 1 Team of the Season: 2021–22

References

External links

Stats and profile at LPFP

1994 births
People from Oliveira de Azeméis
Living people
Portuguese footballers
Association football defenders
Expatriate footballers in Indonesia
Portuguese expatriate footballers 
Portuguese expatriate sportspeople in Indonesia
U.D. Oliveirense players
Arema F.C. players
Liga Portugal 2 players
Liga 1 (Indonesia) players
Sportspeople from Aveiro District